Gomer Robert Williams (March 15, 1942 – March 15, 2022) was an American accountant and politician who served as a member of the Washington House of Representatives, representing the 18th district from 1979 to 1983 and the 19th district from 1983 to 1989. A member of the Republican Party, he was the Republican nominee for Governor of Washington in 1988, losing to incumbent Democrat Booth Gardner by over 24 percentage points. In 1991, he founded the conservative think tank Freedom Foundation.

He died in Longview, Washington on March 15, 2022, on his 80th birthday.

References

1942 births
2022 deaths
20th-century American politicians
American accountants
Republican Party members of the Washington House of Representatives
Pennsylvania politicians